Virus is a 1995 television film starring Nicollette Sheridan, William Devane, Stephen Caffrey, Dakin Matthews, Kurt Fuller, Barry Corbin and William Atherton. It was directed by Armand Mastroianni and written by Robin Cook and Roger Young, based on Cook's 1987 novel Outbreak. The film was also released on DVD under the title Formula for Death.

Plot 
This is based on the medical fiction novel Outbreak by Robin Cook.

Cast 
 Nicollette Sheridan as Marissa Blumenthal
 William Devane as Dr. Harbuck
 Stephen Caffrey as Tad
 Dakin Matthews as Dr. Dubcheck
 Kurt Fuller as Dr. Williams
 Barry Corbin as Dr. Clayman
 William Atherton as Dr. Reginald Holloway
 Joe Minjanes as Dr. Newman

Reception 
Todd Everett of Variety wrote, "In reducing the hazard to the level of personal melodrama, both the feature and the telepic trivialize the real-life menace, which is plenty scary on its own."  John J. O'Connor of The New York Times called the story inane and harebrained.  Chris Willman of the Los Angeles Times wrote that Mastroianni "tries to pump imperiled-woman suspense into the ludicrous scheming, with minimal antidotal effect. Prepare for an outbreak of laughter."

References

External links 
 
 
 

1995 television films
1995 films
1995 thriller films
Films about viral outbreaks
Films directed by Armand Mastroianni
NBC network original films
American thriller television films
Ebola in popular culture
1990s American films
1990s English-language films